The Costa Rica national under-23 football team (also known as the Costa Rica Olympic football team) represents Costa Rica in international football competitions during Olympic Games and Pan American Games. The selection is limited to players under the age of 23, except for three overage players. The team is controlled by the Costa Rican Football Federation.

Competitive record

Olympic Games

Pan American Games

Results and fixtures

Current squad
The following 20 players were called up for the 2020 CONCACAF Men's Olympic Qualifying Championship.

Honours
CONCACAF Olympic Qualifying Tournament
Runners-up (1): 2004

See also
 Costa Rica national football team
 Costa Rica national under-20 football team
 Costa Rica national under-17 football team
 Costa Rica at the FIFA World Cup

References

      

Costa Rica national football team
Central American national under-23 association football teams